The Dumoulin Islands are an uninhabited group of islands in Louisiade Archipelago.

The Dumoulin Islands belong to the western foothills of Louisiade archipelago. They lie 25 km south of Sideia Island and 40 km east of Brumer Islands. The archipelago consists of four big islands and two small islands.

The four islands rise from an undersea shelf of about 6 km in length up to 110 m above sea level. The islands measuring just a few hundred meters in diameter. They are hilly, wooded with steep slopes and cliffs and dense. Baiiri, the largest island, is located at the western end of the group, the second largest island Ana Karu Karua at the eastern end.

In the north of the Dumoulin Islands is a large area of shoals and reefs (Siriki Shoals), the south is a long undersea barrier reef .
The people of Wari have copra plantations on Baiiri.

The first recorded sighting by Europeans of Dumoulin Islands was by the Spanish expedition of Luís Vaez de Torres on 20 July 1606.

References

Islands of Papua New Guinea